The Old Market is a neighborhood located in downtown Omaha, Nebraska, United States, and is bordered by South 10th Street to the east, 13th Street to the west, Farnam Street to the north and Jackson Street to the South. The neighborhood has many restaurants, art galleries and upscale shopping. The area retains its brick paved streets from the turn of the 20th century, horse-drawn carriages, and covered sidewalks in some areas. It is not uncommon to see a variety of street performers, artists, and other vendors.

Historic designation
The area is on the National Register of Historic Places as a historic district, and borders the former site of the Jobbers Canyon Historic District, as well as the extant Omaha Rail and Commerce Historic District and the Warehouses in Omaha MPS. There is a walking tour of historic buildings available from the Omaha Chamber of Commerce. There are also several specifically noted historic buildings within the district.

Historic buildings 
Buildings within the Old Market have served a variety of purposes, and were built during various eras. Originally built to sell groceries wholesale and retail to the city of Omaha and beyond, the Old Market district was preceded by the Market House in Omaha's Jefferson Square.

The Old Market district was formed when the Market House still stood. The buildings and businesses included:

P. E. Iler Block, a contributing property to the district. Built in 1901, the six story building was originally built as a warehouse. A 1990 rehabilitation converted the building into retail and office space.

The Windsor Hotel is a three-story brick building built in 1885. The building was converted into rental residential and commercial space, in 1985. The Broatch Building was built in 1880, and expanded in 1887.

The McClure-Smith Building is a two-story brick building that was built around 1878. Originally a steam bakery, a 1985 rehabilitation converted the building to office and retail space.

The A. I. Root Building is a three-story brick building constructed, in 1904, as offices. The building was doubled in size by the addition of an equal-size portion, in 1909. In 1993, it was converted to retail and residential spaces.

The Morse-Coe Shoe Company, now known as the Mayfield Apartments, was built as a five-story warehouse and light industrial building, in 1894. A 2002 rehabilitation converted the structure to a mixed-use of apartments, retail space and parking. The George H. Lee Building was built, in 1903, as warehouse and office space.

Construction 
Most of the buildings in the Old Market are brick, and the streets throughout are covered with bricked surfaces, cobblestone and asphalt. There were also cast-iron fronts, metal cornices, stone trim, and metal sidewalk coverings shelters attached to many of the buildings around the turn of the 20th century.

Building details

Redevelopment
ConAgra Foods relocated their headquarters to neighbor the Old Market in 1991, after a contentious battle with local advocates after the City of Omaha demolished the Jobbers Canyon Historic District.

2016 Old Market explosion 
On January 9, 2016, at 2:51 pm local time, a large explosion occurred at M's Pub on the northwest corner of 11th and Howard streets causing a large fire to break out. The fire and subsequent efforts to extinguish it caused a total loss of the 100-year-old building as firefighters worked through the night and following morning. Temperatures at the time were in the sub-zero range causing large-scale freezing of the water from the fire fighting efforts. The explosion is believed to have been caused by a gas line that was accidentally ruptured by contractors on behalf of Verizon installing fiber-optic cables. Although several people were injured during the explosion, there were no fatalities. Eyewitnesses reported injuries sustained by multiple people within the immediate vicinity of the explosion, although these were not broadcast  by local media outlets.

Image gallery

References

External links

Official website for the Old Market in Omaha
The Omaha Old Market Online
The Omaha Old Market Online

Tourist attractions in Omaha, Nebraska
History of Downtown Omaha, Nebraska
Neighborhoods in Omaha, Nebraska
National Register of Historic Places in Omaha, Nebraska
Historic districts in Omaha, Nebraska
Omaha Landmarks
Restaurant districts and streets in the United States
Busking venues
Commercial buildings on the National Register of Historic Places in Nebraska